The Genome Project - Write (also known as GP-Write) is a large-scale collaborative research project (an extension of Genome Projects, aimed at reading genomes since 1984) that focuses on the development of technologies for the synthesis and testing of genomes of many different species of microbes, plants, and animals, including the human genome in a sub-project known as Human Genome Project-Write (HGP-Write). Formally announced on 2 June 2016, the project leverages two decades of work on synthetic biology and artificial gene synthesis.

The newly created GP-Write project will be managed by the Center of Excellence for Engineering Biology, an American nonprofit organization. Researchers expect that the ability to artificially synthesize large portions of many genomes will result in many scientific and medical advances.

Microbial Genome Projects - Write 

Technologies for constructing and testing yeast artificial chromosomes (YACs), synthetic yeast genomes (Sc2.0), and virus/phage-resistant bacterial genomes have industrial, agricultural, and medical applications.

Human Genome Project-Write 

A complete haploid copy of the human genome consists of at least three billion DNA nucleotide base pairs, which have been described in the Human Genome Project - Read program (95% completed as of 2004). Among the many goals of GP-Write are the making of cell lines resistant to all viruses and synthesis assembly lines to test variants of unknown significance that arise in research and diagnostic sequencing of human genomes (which has been exponentially improving in cost, quality, and interpretation).

See also 

BRAIN Initiative
ENCODE
EuroPhysiome
Genome Compiler
HUGO Gene Nomenclature Committee
Human Cytome Project
Human Microbiome Project
Human Proteome Project
Human Protein Atlas
Human Variome Project
List of biological databases
Personal Genome Project

References

Further reading

 361 pages. Examines the intellectual origins, history, and motivations of the project to map the human genome; draws on interviews with key figures.

Genome Project-Write: official information page of the consortium

National Human Genome Research Institute (NHGRI). NHGRI led the National Institutes of Health's contribution to the International Human Genome Project. This project, which had as its primary goal the sequencing of the three billion base pairs that make up human genome, was 95% complete in April 2004.

Biotechnology
Genome projects
 
Human Genome Project scientists
Life sciences industry